The Argentine legislative elections of 1962 was held on 18 March. Voters chose their legislators and governors; with a turnout of 85.7%.

Background

Peronism and its political vehicle, the Justicialist Party remained banned from political life, as they had been since 1955. Their exiled leader, Juan Perón had given President Arturo Frondizi a critical endorsement in 1958; but Frondizi's inability to lift the ban on Peronism had led Perón to support proxy political partes organized after his overthrow, notably Juan Atilio Bramuglia's Popular Union. The Popular Union nominated textile industry workers' leader Andrés Framini for governor of the Province of Buenos Aires (home to 38% of Argentines) and for vice-governor: Perón, himself. The leader believed this symbolic spot on the ticket (which, unable to return, he could never fill) would prove a powerful endorsement to Framini; but the move backfired when Frondizi was forced to declare Perón's candidacy null and void.

Framini selected a new (plausible) running mate, though his unofficial slogan was unequivocal: "Framini-Anglada, Perón to the Rosada!" The clear reference to the Casa Rosada (the president's executive office building) put anti-peronists and the military on high alert when, in fact, Perón's proxies won 10 of 14 governorships at stake - including Framini's victory in the all-important Province of Buenos Aires. President Frondizi was forced to annul Framini's March 18 victory, and despite quickly obeying military demands, on March 28 he was overthrown.

Careful to avoid the appearance of a coup d'état, military leaders appointed Senate President José María Guido as Frondizi's successor (as the Argentine Constitution prescribes in case of the absence of both the president and v.p.). Guido, a member of Frondizi's UCRI, reluctantly accepted the figurehead post and on May 1, annulled the results of all legislative and gubernatorial 1962 elections.

Results

Results by province

References 

1962
Argentina
March 1962 events in South America
Annulled elections